Monoplex aquatilis, common name the cosmopolitan hairy triton, is a species of predatory sea snail, a marine gastropod mollusk in the family Cymatiidae.

Distribution
This species has a wide distribution across the Atlantic Ocean, European waters, Cape Verde, the Gulf of Mexico, the Caribbean Sea, the Red Sea, the Indian Ocean along the Mascarene Basin and Tanzania and in the Indo-West Pacific Ocean.

Description 
The shell size varies between 35 mm and 120 mm.

The maximum recorded shell length is 95 mm.

Habitat 
Minimum recorded depth is 0 m. Maximum recorded depth is 18 m.

References

Further reading 
 Spry, J.F. (1961). The sea shells of Dar es Salaam: Gastropods. Tanganyika Notes and Records 56
 Drivas, J. & M. Jay (1988). Coquillages de La Réunion et de l'île Maurice
 Rolán E., 2005. Malacological Fauna From The Cape Verde Archipelago. Part 1, Polyplacophora and Gastropoda.
 Rosenberg, G., F. Moretzsohn, and E. F. García. 2009. Gastropoda (Mollusca) of the Gulf of Mexico, Pp. 579–699 in Felder, D.L. and D.K. Camp (eds.), Gulf of Mexico–Origins, Waters, and Biota. Biodiversity. Texas A&M Press, College Station, Texas.
 Beu A.G. 2010 [August]. Neogene tonnoidean gastropods of tropical and South America: contributions to the Dominican Republic and Panama Paleontology Projects and uplift of the Central American Isthmus. Bulletins of American Paleontology 377-378: 550 pp, 79 pls.

External links
 
 Reeve, L. A. (1844). Monograph of the genus Triton. In: Conchologia Iconica, or, illustrations of the shells of molluscous animals, vol. 2, pls 1-20 and unpaginated text. L. Reeve & Co., London

Cymatiidae
Taxa named by Lovell Augustus Reeve
Gastropods described in 1844
Molluscs of the Atlantic Ocean
Invertebrates of the Indian Ocean